Gluttons is an American rock band formed in Cleveland, Ohio, United States, in 2002. The band has been described as a combination of Motörhead and the Misfits. Gluttons have released several demos and live albums independently, and a self-titled 7" on A389 Recordings in 2009. They have also been featured on several compilation discs. Guitarist/vocalist Human Furnace also plays in Cleveland hardcore band Ringworm. Guitarist Damien Perry (of Red Giant) also plays in Cleveland band The Great Iron Snake, Ed Stephens plays bass in Ringworm, Shok Paris and Destructor, and vocalist Kevin Orr also sings for Strange Notes.

Members

Current
Human Furnace – vocals, guitar
Chris Dora – drums
Kevin Orr – vocals
Ed Stephens – bass
Damien Perry – lead guitar

Former members
Brook Murray – guitar
Eric Zellmer – drums
Shawn Vanek - guitar

Select discography
Cleveland Ain't It Fun -"Black Falcon" (compilation) – 2003
Spent All Money on Booze, Broads and Drugs... The Rest I Squandered Away" (demo) – 2003The Baddest Shit North of Hell (demo) – 2004Live Vol. 1 – 2005Live at the Jigsaw – 2006Hard Times in Cleveland: Spitfire Compilation'' -"Bar Fight" – 2008
"Gluttons" 7" (A389 Recordings) – 2009

References

External links
 MySpace

Heavy metal musical groups from Ohio
Punk rock groups from Ohio
Musical groups from Cleveland